Demon is a poem by Mikhail Lermontov, written in several versions in the years 1829 to 1839. It is considered a masterpiece of European Romantic poetry.

Lermontov began work on the poem when he was just 14 or 15, but completed it only during his Caucasus exile. Lermontov wrote six major variations of the poem, and the final version was not published until 1842, after his death.

The poem is set in Lermontov's beloved Caucasus Mountains. It opens with the eponymous protagonist wandering the earth, hopeless and troubled. He dwells in infinite isolation, his immortality and unlimited power a worthless burden. Then he spies the beautiful Georgian Princess Tamara, dancing for her wedding, and in the desert of his soul wells an indescribable emotion.

The Demon, acting as a brutal and powerful tyrant, destroys his rival: at his instigation, robbers come to despoil the wedding and kill Tamara's betrothed. The Demon courts Tamara, and Tamara knows fear, yet in him she  sees not a demon nor an angel but a tortured soul. Eventually she yields to his embrace, but his kiss is fatal. And though she is taken to Heaven, the Demon is left again "Alone in all the universe, Abandoned, without love or hope!...".

Gallery

See also
 The Demon, an opera by Anton Rubinstein based on the poem

References

External links
Mikhail Lermontov - The Demon in English and Russian
Full text of Demon 
Full English translation at Archive.org 
Another English version 
 
Analysis of Demon at Russian Cinema 
Analysis of Demon at Litra.ru 
Comparative analysis of Demon and Mtsyri at Erudition.ru

Further reading
 

Poetry by Mikhail Lermontov
1842 poems